SLS may refer to the Space Launch System, a launch vehicle developed by NASA. It may also refer to:

Education 
 Stanford Law School, California, U.S.
 Sydney Law School, Australia
 Symbiosis Law School, India
 Same language subtitling, of TV

Places 
 Sim Lim Square, a shopping centre, Singapore
 SLS Las Vegas, a hotel and casino, US

Politics
 Former Samostalna liberalna stranka (Independent Liberal Party (Kosovo))
 Former Srpska liberalna stranka (Serbian Liberal Party)
 Slovenska ljudska stranka (Slovenian People's Party)
 Slovenská ľudová strana (Slovak People's Party, SĽS)
 Students for a Libertarian Society, an American student organisation

Science and technology
 Selective laser sintering, an additive manufacturing technique
 Sea level standard conditions
 Sodium lauryl sulfate, a surfactant
 Static light scattering, a technique to measure molecular weight
 Standard linear solid model, of a viscoelastic material
 Streptolysin S, a bacterial exotoxin
 Swiss Light Source, a synchrotron

Computing 
 Scalable Lossless Coding, an MPEG-4 Audio extension
 Select-String or sls, a Powershell cmdlet
 Single-level store, in computer storage
 Softlanding Linux System, a Linux distribution

Transport
 Cadillac Seville Luxury Sedan, an automobile
 Mercedes-Benz SLS AMG, an automobile
 Stephenson Locomotive Society, UK, founded 1909
 Space Launching System, a 1960s USAF rocket program
 Space Launch System, an American super heavy-lift expendable launch vehicle under development by NASA since 2011
 Space Launch System (Turkey), a project to develop the satellite launch capability of Turkey

Other uses 
 Street League Skateboarding, a tournament
 Sign language in Singapore (ISO 639 language code: sls)
 Shit Life Syndrome, a term used by physicians
 Somaliland Shilling, currency of the Republic of Somaliland

See also

 
 SL (disambiguation), for the singular of "SLs"